The 2018–19 Women's EHF Champions League was the 26th edition of the Women's EHF Champions League, the competition for top women's clubs of Europe, organized and supervised by the European Handball Federation.

Győri Audi ETO KC defended their title by defeating Rostov-Don 25–24 in the final, to win their fifth overall and third straight title.

Competition format
16 teams participated in the competition, divided in four groups who played in a round robin, home and away format. The top three teams in each group qualified for the main round.

Main round
The 12 qualified teams were divided in two groups who played in a round robin, home and away format. The points and the goal difference gained against the qualified teams in the first round were carried over. The top four teams in each group qualified for the quarterfinals.

Knockout stage
After the quarterfinals, the culmination of the season, the Women's EHF Final four, continued in its existing format, with the four top teams from the competition competing for the title.

Team allocation
14 teams were directly qualified for the group stage.

Round and draw dates

Qualification stage

The draw was held on 27 June 2018. The two winners of the qualification tournaments advanced to the group stage. The second and third placed teams were translate to the third round of EHF Cup; the fourth places entered in the second round.

Qualification tournament 1

Qualification tournament 2

Group stage

The draw was held on 29 June 2018. In each group, teams play against each other in a double round-robin format, with home and away matches.

Group A

Group B

Group C

Group D

Main round

In each group, teams played against each other in a double round-robin format, with home and away matches. Points against teams from the same group are carried over.

Group 1

Group 2

Knockout stage

The top four placed teams from each of the two main round groups advanced to the knockout stage.

Quarterfinals

Final four

Final

Awards and statistics

All-Star Team
The all-star team and awards were announced on 10 May 2019.

Goalkeeper:  (Vipers Kristiansand)
Right wing:  (CSM București)
Right back:  (Rostov-Don)
Centre back:  (Győri Audi ETO KC)
Left back:  (Győri Audi ETO KC)
Left wing:  (Metz Handball)
Pivot:  (Győri Audi ETO KC)

Other awards
MVP of the Final Four:  (Győri Audi ETO KC)
Best coach:  (Metz Handball)
Best young player:  (FTC-Rail Cargo Hungaria)
Best defence player:  (Győri Audi ETO KC)

Top goalscorers

References

External links
Official website

 
2018
2018 in European sport
2019 in European sport
2018 in women's handball
2019 in women's handball